The 1992 GM Goodwrench 500 was the second stock car race of the 1992 NASCAR Winston Cup Series season and the 27th iteration of the event. The race was held on Sunday, March 1, 1992, before an audience of 43,600 in Rockingham, North Carolina, at North Carolina Speedway, a  permanent high-banked racetrack. The race took the scheduled 492 laps to complete. At race's end, Junior Johnson & Associates driver Bill Elliott would manage to dominate the late stages of the race to take his 35th career NASCAR Winston Cup Series victory and his first victory of the season. To fill out the top three, Robert Yates Racing driver Davey Allison and Leo Jackson Motorsports driver Harry Gant would finish second and third, respectively.

Background 

North Carolina Motor Speedway was opened as a flat, one-mile oval on October 31, 1965. In 1969, the track was extensively reconfigured to a high-banked, D-shaped oval just over one mile in length. In 1997, North Carolina Motor Speedway merged with Penske Motorsports, and was renamed North Carolina Speedway. Shortly thereafter, the infield was reconfigured, and competition on the infield road course, mostly by the SCCA, was discontinued. Currently, the track is home to the Fast Track High Performance Driving School.

Entry list 

 (R) denotes rookie driver.

Qualifying 
Qualifying was split into two rounds. The first round was held on Friday, February 28, at 2:30 PM EST. Each driver would have one lap to set a time. During the first round, the top 20 drivers in the round would be guaranteed a starting spot in the race. If a driver was not able to guarantee a spot in the first round, they had the option to scrub their time from the first round and try and run a faster lap time in a second round qualifying run, held on Saturday, February 29, at 11:30 AM EST. As with the first round, each driver would have one lap to set a time. For this specific race, positions 21-40 would be decided on time, and depending on who needed it, a select amount of positions were given to cars who had not otherwise qualified but were high enough in owner's points; up to two provisionals were given. If needed, a past champion who did not qualify on either time or provisionals could use a champion's provisional, adding one more spot to the field.

No drivers would fail to qualify.

Full qualifying results

Race results

Standings after the race 

Drivers' Championship standings

Note: Only the first 10 positions are included for the driver standings.

References 

1992 NASCAR Winston Cup Series
NASCAR races at Rockingham Speedway
March 1992 sports events in the United States
1992 in sports in North Carolina